The Utah Open is the Utah state open golf tournament, open to both amateur and professional golfers. It is organized by the Utah section of the PGA of America. It was first played in 1926 and has been played at a variety of courses around the state. It was occasionally a PGA Tour event: in the 1940s, 1960, and 1963. Since 2003, the title sponsor has been Siegfried & Jensen.

Winners

2022 Blake Tomlinson
2021 Derek Fribbs
2020 Peter Kuest
2019 Sam Saunders
2018 Dusty Fielding
2017 Patrick Fishburn (amateur)
2016 Zahkai Brown
2015 Nate Lashley
2014 B. J. Staten
2013 Zach Johnson
2012 James Drew
2011 Clay Ogden
2010 Nicholas Mason
2009 Nate Lashley
2008 Bruce Summerhays
2007 Clay Ogden
2006 Pete Stone
2005 Nick McKinlay
2004 Greg Buckway (amateur)
2003 Steve Friesen
2002 Boyd Summerhays
2001 Kim Thompson
2000 Todd Fischer
1999 Dean Wilson
1998 Todd Demsey
1997 Steve Runge
1996 Patrick Boyd
1995 J. B. Sneve
1994 Warren Schutte
1993 Dennis Paulson
1992 Grant Waite
1991 Eric Hogg
1990 Mark Carnevale
1989 Neal Lancaster
1988 Jay Don Blake
1987 Perry Arthur
1986 Clark Burroughs
1985 Mike Reid
1984 Richard Zokol
1983 Mike Reid
1982 Larry Webb
1981 Jimmy Blair
1980 Ray Arinno
1979 Bob Betley
1978 Terry Mauney
1977 Larry Webb
1976 Gary Vanier
1975 Mike Brannan
1974 Mike Malaska
1973 Paul Allen
1972 Victor Regalado
1971 Ernesto Perez Acosta
1970 Buddy Allin
1969 Tommy Williams
1968 Dick Payne
1967 Richard Potzner
1966 Ernie Schneiter, Jr.
1965 Randy Glover ($2,000)
1964 No tournament
1963 Tommy Jacobs ($6,400)
1962 Zell Eaton ($500)
1961 Al Geiberger ($1,600)
1960 Bill Johnston ($2,800)
1959 Bob Rosburg ($1,500)
1958 Dow Finsterwald ($2,000)
1957 Zell Eaton ($1,500)
1956 Dick Lundahl
1955 Ellsworth Vines ($800)
1954 Bill Johnston ($800)
1953 Zell Eaton ($750)
1952 Bud Ward ($750)
1951 Smiley Quick ($750)
1950 Harold West ($1,000)
1949 Joe Bernolfo (amateur)
1948 Lloyd Mangrum ($2,150)
1947 Johnny Palmer ($2,200)
1946 Emery Zimmerman
1945 Emery Zimmerman
1944 Jug McSpaden ($700)
1943 George Schneiter
1942 Ed Dudley
1941 George Schneiter
1940 Emery Zimmerman
1939 Emery Zimmerman ($350)
1938 Al Zimmerman
1937 Al Zimmerman
1936 George Schneiter
1935 Fred Morrison
1934 Ed Kingsley
1933 Ky Laffoon ($201)
1932 C. E. Foley
1931 Owen Covey
1930 Babe McHugh
1929 Babe McHugh
1928 Tom McHugh
1927 C. E. Foley
1926 Eddie Morrison

References

External links
Utah section of the PGA of America
List of winners

Former PGA Tour events
Golf in Utah
State Open golf tournaments
PGA of America sectional tournaments
Recurring sporting events established in 1926
1926 establishments in Utah